The 16th IAAF World Indoor Championships in Athletics were held between March 17 and 20, 2016 in Portland, Oregon, United States.

The event did not feature Russia. Following a WADA investigation into widespread and institutional doping practices in Russian athletics, the IAAF provisionally suspended Russia's membership of the organisation in November 2015, effectively excluding the country both from hosting events and entering competitions.

Russia's effective exclusion from the tournament was confirmed in November 2015 when it was announced by IAAF that a decision over lifting its provisional suspension from international athletics would not be taken until the end of March at the earliest.

Bidding process
Portland was selected unanimously with the only other bidder being 2003 host Birmingham, England.  Birmingham was ultimately selected as the host of the 2018 IAAF World Indoor Championships.  The reason Portland was selected for 2016 and Birmingham being selected in 2018 is that the IAAF wanted more time between events in the UK with London hosting the 2012 Olympics as well as the 2017 World Championships in Athletics along with Cardiff hosting the 2016 IAAF World Half Marathon Championships.

Venue

The event took place inside the Oregon Convention Center, fitted with the necessary 200m track and seating for 8,000 spectators.  A concept drawing of the plans were released in early 2015, showing a two toned track colored (Oregon) green, with trees adorning the peristyle of the indoor arena.

Schedule

All dates are PDT (UTC-7)

Medal summary

Men

Exhibition event

Women

Exhibition event

Medal table

Records

Men

Women

Participating nations
In brackets the number of athletes participating.

 (1)
 (1)
 (1)
 (1)
 (2)
 (1)
 (1)
 (1)
 (7)
 (1)
 (1)
 (10)
 (1)
 (3)
 (6)
 (4)
 (1)
 (10)
 (2)
 (1)
 (1)
 (2)
 (14)
 (1)
 (1)
 (12)
 (1)
 (1)
 (1)
 (1)
 (2)
 (3)
 (1)
 (10)
 (1)
 (1)
 (2)
 (1)
 (2)
 (1)
 (1)
 (2)
 (12)
 (2)
 (10)
 (1)
 (14)
 (2)
 (23)
 (6)
 (3)
 (1)
 (1)
 (1)
 (1)
 (1)
 (1)
 (6)
 (1)
 (1)
 (1)
 (1)
 (5)
 (3)
 (19)
 (4)
 (1)
 (2)
 (12)
 (1)
 (1)
 (1)
 (1)
 (1)
 (1)
 (1)
 (1)
 (1)
 (1)
 (1)
 (1)
 (1)
 (1)
 (1)
 (1)
 (4)
 (1)
 (8)
 (5)
 (1)
 (10)
 (1)
 (1)
 (1)
 (1)
 (1)
 (1)
 (1)
 (1)
 (1)
 (15)
 (4)
 (1)
 (3)
 (1)
 (10)
 (1)
 (2)
 (2)
 (1)
 (1)
 (2)
 (1)
 (1)
 (1)
 (1)
 (2)
 (3)
 (6)
 (15)
 (1)
 (1)
 (8)
 (2)
 (1)
 (11)
 (2)
 (1)
 (1)
 (13)
 (1)
 (57)
 (2)
 (1)
 (2)
 (2)
 (1)

References

External links

Official website

 
World Athletics Indoor Championships
World Indoor Championships
World Indoor Championships
World Indoor Championships
Sports competitions in Portland, Oregon
International track and field competitions hosted by the United States
IAAF World Indoor Championships
Track and field in Oregon
IAAF World Indoor Championships